Agathla Peak or Agathlan is a peak south of Monument Valley, Arizona, which rises over  above the surrounding terrain. The English designation Agathla is derived from the Navajo name  meaning 'much wool', apparently for the fur of antelope and deer accumulating on the rock. The mountain is considered sacred by the Navajo.

Agathla Peak is an eroded volcanic plug consisting of volcanic breccia cut by dikes of an unusual igneous rock called minette. It is one of many such volcanic diatremes that are found in Navajo country of northeast Arizona and northwest New Mexico. Agathla Peak and Shiprock in New Mexico are the most prominent. These rocks are part of the Navajo Volcanic Field, in the southern Colorado Plateau. Ages of these minettes and associated more unusual igneous rocks cluster near 25 million years.

Climbing history 

Rock climbing is not currently allowed on Agathla Peak and surrounding Navajo Nation lands; however, in 1949 there were no such restrictions, and the first known ascent of the peak was done on May 29, 1949, by Ray Garner, Herb Conn, and Lee Pedrick. 
The climbers followed what is now called "West Face" route, which is 550 feet long, and they brought over 70 pounds of climbing equipment including: 50 pitons, 40 tamp-in bolts (plus two sets of drills, tamp tools and hammers), 15 carabiners, four 120-foot nylon ropes, and twelve quarts of water. The climbing took a whole day and they had to spend the night on the top before descending the next day.

See also

 Owl Rock
 Chaistla Butte

References

Further reading

External links

 
 
 Agathla Peak Peakware, World Mountain Encyclopedia.

Colorado Plateau
Diatremes of Arizona
Landforms of Navajo County, Arizona
Religious places of the indigenous peoples of North America
Oligocene volcanism
Sacred mountains
Volcanic plugs of Arizona
Geography of the Navajo Nation
Mountains of Navajo County, Arizona